Morena (Margaret Camilleri, full name Margerita Camilleri Fenech) (b. 1984) is a singer from Sannat, Gozo, Malta. "Morena" means "brunette", which fits her complexion.

Morena in Eurovision
In 2006, Morena entered the Malta Song for Europe competition with Paul Giordimaina and the song "Time" they ended 9th with 3046 votes.

Two years later Morena entered Malta Song for Europe once again, with 2 songs, "Casanova" and "Vodka". They both passed through from the semi-final to the final. "Casanova" ended 5th with 3,607 televotes and 40 Jury Votes, while "Vodka" won the contest with 49 points from the jury and a total of 16,979 votes from the public (33%).

Morena took part in the second semi-final of the 2008 Eurovision Song Contest in Belgrade on 22 May. However, she did not make it to the final evening.

References

1984 births
Living people
Eurovision Song Contest entrants of 2008
Gozitan singers
Eurovision Song Contest entrants for Malta
21st-century Maltese women singers
21st-century Maltese singers
Maltese pop singers
People from Sannat